Help is the eighth studio album  by the American garage rock band Oh Sees, released on April 28, 2009 on In the Red Records. It was the band's second album to be released under the name Thee Oh Sees.

Track listing

2009 albums
Oh Sees albums
In the Red Records albums